Beğendik Bridge, also known as Botan Bridge, is a road bridge crossing the Botan River at Beğendik in Siirt Province in southeastern Turkey. Inaugurated in 2020, it is Turkey's highest and longest main-span bridge.

History
The construction of the bridge was projected in the 1970s. The construction works for the bridge and the roads, which started in 1998, progressed slow in particular due to the actions of terrorist organizations in the region. The construction works started again in 2014.

About three months later, in March 2018, the remaining north structure imploded, causing the north pier and the deck to collapse and fall to the valley slope. The incidents delayed the completion date, which had been set for the end of 2018.

The bridge was completed early November 2019, and was opened to road traffic on 11 July 2020.  The bridge connects the Van-Tatvan-Bitlis with Siirt-Mardin-Batman provincial road line .

Characteristics
Crossing the Botan River south of Beğendik town in Pervari district of Siirt Province, Southeastern Anatolia, it is a suspension type concrete balanced cantilever bridge.

This road, with bridge and tunnels, replaces the former very dangerous and long road with hairpin turns winding in high elevation mountainous terrain. Through the Beğendik Bridge, cargo transport between Iran and Iraq takes three hours instead of six hours before. The travel time between Van and Pervari decreased from about five hours to nearly two hours on a safety and comfortable route. The distance between Beğendik and Pervari shortened .

A workforce of total 1,025, of which 255 were from Beğendik town, was employed during the construction. The bridge cost  100 million.

References

Road bridges in Turkey
Bridges completed in 2020
2020 establishments in Turkey
Buildings and structures in Siirt Province
Cantilever bridges
Transport in Siirt Province